Denisia similella is a moth of the family Oecophoridae. It is found in Europe.

The wingspan is about 15 mm. The head is ochreous-yellowish, with fuscous central stripe. Forewings dark fuscous ; a spot near base, connected with base by a streak, a spot about middle on or near dorsum, a small spot beyond and above this, often connected with it, a spot on costa
at 3/4, and sometimes a tornal dot pale yellow. Hindwings under 1, grey.

The moth flies from June to July depending on the location.

The larvae feed on fungus under dead wood or bark.

References

External links
 Denisia similella at UKmoths

Oecophoridae
Moths of Europe
Moths described in 1796